George Turnbull (21 July 1877 - 14 January 1970) was a Scotland international rugby union player.

Rugby Union career

Amateur career

Turnbull played for West of Scotland.

He later played for Edinburgh Wanderers.

Provincial career

He played for Glasgow District in their inter-city match against Edinburgh District on 7 December 1895.

Turnbull played for Cities District in their match against Provinces District on 28 December 1895.

He played for a Schoolboy side against the Scotland Probables on Wednesday 23 January 1896.

He played for the Anglo-Scots against the South of Scotland District on 26 December 1903.

International career

Turnbull played for Scotland 5 times, from 1896 to 1904.

Military career

He joined the British Army in India and was a captain of the 26th Punjabis.

References

1877 births
1970 deaths
Scottish Exiles (rugby union) players
Scotland international rugby union players
Cities District players
Glasgow District (rugby union) players
Edinburgh Wanderers RFC players
Scottish rugby union players
Rugby union players from Edinburgh
Rugby union forwards